David Shilling (born 27 June 1949) is an English milliner and fashion designer. He designs hats and clothing displayed on Ladies' Day at Royal Ascot, and has been called "The Hatman” and "the Mad Hatter.”

Childhood 
David Shilling was born in London and attended St Paul's School, London. By the age of twelve he was designing hats and outfits for his mother, Gertrude, for her to wear to the Ascot horse races. He designed these for her until she died in 1999. By the age of thirteen he was creating toys to sell at his local shop, and later, scarves and accessories to major British retailers such as Fenwick, Fortnum & Mason, and Liberty.

Career
Shilling opened his first store in Marylebone High Street in 1976: two days after its opening the store received an order from a rock star's wife for twenty four hats.

His first collection was purchased in America by Bloomingdale's; and other stores began selling his creations soon afterwards. In the late 1970s Bergdorf Goodman charged up to $3,000 for a David Shilling hat.

BBC British TV series "Arena" created a film on Shilling titled How to Get Ahead in Fashion (1980).

In 1988, he was invited by the USSR to show his hats during the first Miss USSR Pageant in Moscow, the first live TV broadcast throughout the USSR. In 1990, he headed a successful mission for the United Nations in Ecuador which led to other projects as an art and design ambassador with the UN in Africa and Asia.

Shilling eventually stopped wholesale hat-making and moved to producing only made-to-order garments.

He designed the emblem for Britain's Festival of Arts and Culture in 1994; due to this he became a driving force behind the new "Cool Britannia" re-branding of Britain. His designs for theatre, opera, ballet, film and TV formed an exhibition at the Royal Shakespeare Theatre in 1998.

In 2007 he displayed the first of an expected ten collections of hats (each priced at £1,000,000) at Top Marques Monaco. In November 2009 he held his first show in mainland China at the Ritz-Carlton in Beijing. His work encompasses all areas of art, fashion and design, outdoor sculpture, jewellery, men's and ladies' bespoke clothing, accessories, home furnishings, theatre, ballet, opera and interior design.

In 2010, a hat with diamonds created by David in the late 1970s was nominated by the Guinness World Records as the most expensive hat in the world in the 21st century. He previewed a collection of hats designed for men at the Embassy of Monaco, London in 2012. In 2021, he applied to join a ten-day mission to the International Space Station (ISS) in a mixed crew of professional and privately funded astronauts.

Charitable work 
Shilling has worked with many charities, including Consortium for Street Children for whom he designed their logo & helped organise their launch at 10 Downing Street, World Horse Welfare and the Darwin Centre, Natural History Museum, London. He is a patron of Action on Addiction and created a millinery course for HM Prison, The Mount.

Personal life 
He currently lives in Monaco.

Notable events 
2005: a series of  stainless steel and aluminium sculptures collectively called "Hope" were installed atop Primrose Hill in London's Regent's Park as part of "Discover - Positive Elements of Life".
2018: he launched World Yacht Party, a collection of music videos and recordings.

In collections 
Metropolitan Museum of Art (New York)
Philadelphia Museum of Art
Los Angeles County Museum
The Louvre's Musée des Arts Décoratifs
Victoria and Albert Museum (London)
British Government Art Collection Acrylic on Canvas (London)
Holdenby House Steel Sculptures (Northampton, England)

External links 

Living people
British expatriates in Monaco
British milliners
People educated at St Paul's School, London
1949 births